DYMA (100.9 FM) Radyo Jagna is a radio station owned and operated by Apollo Broadcast Investors. Its studios and transmitter are located at Brgy. Poblacion, Jagna, Bohol.

References

External links
Radyo Jagna FB Page

Radio stations established in 2011
Radio stations in Bohol